Don't Give Up on Your Dreams, Buddy! is an EP by I'm from Barcelona. It charted for 13 weeks in Sverigetopplistan, the official Swedish Singles Chart peaking at number 12.

Track listing
"We're from Barcelona" (2:59)
"Treehouse" (5:02)
"Ola Kala" (3:39)
"The Painter" (3:30)

Charts

References

2006 EPs
I'm from Barcelona albums